The Baisha Port is a port in Liuqiu Township, Pingtung County, Taiwan. It is the main port for people to get in and out from Liuqiu Island.

Architecture
The port is designed with a sail-shaped building with rainbow colors. The port features ticket counter, visitor information center and other boat services, such as tour boats, glass bottom boats etc.

Destinations
The port serves ferries to Donggang Township on the island of Taiwan.

See also
 Transportation in Taiwan

References

Ports and harbors of Pingtung County